Joshua Tibatemwa-Ekirikubinza (born 10 September 1996) is a Ugandan Olympic swimmer. He represented his country at the 2016 Summer Olympics, where he ranked 64th with a time of 25.98 seconds. He did not advance to the semifinals. He was the flagbearer for Uganda during the opening ceremony.

Major Results

Individual

Long course

Short course

References

External links 

1996 births
Living people
Ugandan male swimmers
Sportspeople from Kampala
Olympic swimmers of Uganda
Swimmers at the 2016 Summer Olympics
Swimmers at the 2014 Commonwealth Games
Swimmers at the 2018 Commonwealth Games
Commonwealth Games competitors for Uganda
20th-century Ugandan people
21st-century Ugandan people